John Falchenberg (12 September 1883 – 5 November 1960) was a Norwegian discus thrower. He represented Kristiania IF and IK Tjalve.

At the 1908 Summer Olympics he competed in the discus final with a throw of unknown length. He became Norwegian champion in discus throw in the years 1904, 1906-1908 and 1911-1912. In 1904 he became national champion in shot put as well.

His personal best throw was 46.48 metres, achieved in August 1926 on Bislett stadion.

References

1883 births
1960 deaths
Norwegian male discus throwers
Athletes (track and field) at the 1908 Summer Olympics
Olympic athletes of Norway